Naples is a Song (Italian:Napoli è una canzone) is a 1927 Italian silent film directed by Eugenio Perego and starring Leda Gys, Angelo Ferrari and Giuseppe Gherardi.

Cast
 Leda Gys as Rosella 
 Angelo Ferrari as Max  
 Giuseppe Gherardi as O' pazzariello  
 Carlo Reiter as Don Aristide Nasetti  
 Gennaro Sebastiani as Il nanetto 
 Lorenzo Soderini as O' prufessore  
 Grethel Stein as Mary

References

Bibliography
 Bruno, Giuliana. Streetwalking on a Ruined Map: Cultural Theory and the City Films of Elvira Notari. Princeton University Press, 1993.

External links 
 

1927 films
Italian silent feature films
1920s Italian-language films
Films set in Naples
Films directed by Eugenio Perego
Italian black-and-white films